The western spotted catshark (Asymbolus occiduus) is a cat shark of the family Scyliorhinidae found only around southwestern Australia, at depths between 100 and 400 m. Males can grow up to 60cm in length, while females have a maximum length of 53cm. The western spotted catshark reproduces via oviparity.

References

 

western spotted catshark
Marine fish of Southern Australia
western spotted catshark